Chandelier of Stars is the sixteenth studio album by Australian country music artist John Williamson. It was released in August 2005 and peaked at number 11 on the ARIA Charts. The album was certified gold in 2005.

At the Country Music Awards of Australia in January 2006 Williamson won 'Top Selling Album of the Year' and 'Top Selling Album of the Year' for Chandelier of Stars.

Track listing

Charts

Weekly charts

Year-end charts

Certifications

Release history

References

2005 albums
John Williamson (singer) albums
EMI Records albums